Sir H. N. Reliance Foundation Hospital and Research Centre, managed by Reliance Foundation, is located in Girgaon, Mumbai, India. Founded in 1925 by Gordhandas Bhagwandas Narottamdas, it was renovated and reopened in 2014. The hospital is largely called "Hurkisondas Hospital" and "Reliance Hospital".

History

Gordhandas Bhagwandas Narottamdas, a physician and social worker, proposed the Harkisan Narottamdas Hospital (also spelled Hurkisondas Nurrotumdas Hospital) to his adoptive mother Zaverben and his aunt Mankunwar, wife of deceased Harkisan Narottamdas Sheth. They agreed and donated the bungalow and funds. In 1918, the foundation of the hospital was laid by the Lady Willingdon. In 1925, the construction was completed and inaugurated by Lesli Wilson, the Governor of Bombay. Gordhandas worked there until his death in 1975.

The hospital was taken over by the Reliance Foundation in 2006. The renovation of the heritage building and the building behind it started in 2011. It was inaugurated and rededicated by the Indian Prime Minister Narendra Modi on 25 October 2014.

Facilities 

The following services are located in the tower: emergency medical services, the out-patient department, in-patient services, diagnostics, operation theatre complex, an executive health check facility, day care, woman and child health, intensive critical care, and isolation rooms.

The hospital offers healthcare facilities pertaining to six key areas: Cardiac Sciences, Nephro-Urology, Neuro Sciences, Oncology, Orthopedics & Spine and Woman & Child Health, Over 258 consultants in various areas of specialization drive and manage the activities. They are assisted by a staff of 1,000, including paramedical and other support. The hospital also provides free and subsidized out-patient and in-patient treatment to the needy.

References

External links
 Official website

Hospitals in Mumbai
Reliance Life Sciences
1925 establishments in India
Hospital buildings completed in 1925
20th-century architecture in India